Ochina hirsuta is a species of ivy-boring beetle in the Ptinidae family.

References

Ptinidae
Beetles described in 1889